Peter Hawkins (born 16 December 1985) is a former Irish professional racing cyclist who last rode for . He now works as a cycling coach for upshift-velo.

Career
Although Hawkin's professional racing career only lasted two years he raced at the elite level in Ireland from 2008. In 2008 and 2014 he won the National Criterium Championships allowing him to wear the jersey of Ireland in all Criteriums raced those seasons. After making it to the finish of Stage 2 in the breakaway Hawkins sprinted to fourth place by doing so he moved into the Yellow leaders jersey. Hawkins abandoned the race during Stage 3 after crashing and having been suspected of having a broken collarbone. He represented Northern-Ireland at the 2014 Commonwealth Games racing in the Men's road race where he was one of 128 who did not finish.

Major results
Sources:
2006
 3rd Overall Portaferry
1st Stage 1
2008
 1st  National Criterium Championships
 1st Stage 1 Surrey League Stage Race
 2nd Des Hanlon Memorial
2009
 3rd Des Hanlon Memorial
 3rd GP Dussessoye André Beselare-Zonnebeke
2011
 2nd Des Hanlon Memorial
 9th National Championships - Road Race
2012
 1st Des Hanlon Memorial
 1st Bobby Crilly Classic
 1st Ulster Championships
 4th Overall Tour of the North
1st Stage 2
 5th Stage 1 Tour of Britain
2014
 1st  National Criterium Championships
 7th Melton International CiCLE Classic
2015
 4th Stage 3 An Post Ras

References

External links

1985 births
Living people
Irish male cyclists
Place of birth missing (living people)